Dahufa is a 2017 Chinese animated fantasy film. The film is directed by Bu Sifan and produced by Angie Lam. It stars voice cast of Xiao Liansha, Feng Sheng, King Shih-Chieh, and Zhang Youwu. It was the first film in China that was self-rated PG-13 by the film's producers.

Reception

Accolades

References

External links 
 
 
 

2017 animated films
2017 films
2017 fantasy films
Beijing Enlight Pictures films
Chinese animated films
Chinese animated fantasy films
Chinese fantasy films
2010s dystopian films
2010s Mandarin-language films